Mainz is an electoral constituency (German: Wahlkreis) represented in the Bundestag. It elects one member via first-past-the-post voting. Under the current constituency numbering system, it is designated as constituency 205. It is located in eastern Rhineland-Palatinate, comprising the city of Mainz and the northern part of the Mainz-Bingen district.

Mainz was created for the inaugural 1949 federal election. Since 2021, it has been represented by Daniel Baldy of the Social Democratic Party (SPD).

Geography
Mainz is located in eastern Rhineland-Palatinate. As of the 2021 federal election, it comprises the independent city of Mainz as well as the municipalities of Bingen am Rhein, Budenheim, and Ingelheim am Rhein and the Verbandsgemeinden of Gau-Algesheim, Nieder-Olm, and Rhein-Nahe from the Mainz-Bingen district.

History
Mainz was created in 1949. In the 1949 election, it was Rhineland-Palatinate constituency 9 in the numbering system. In the 1953 through 1976 elections, it was number 156. In the 1980 through 1998 elections, it was number 154. In the 2002 election, it was number 208. In the 2005 election, it was number 207. In the 2009 and 2013 elections, it was number 206. Since the 2017 election, it has been number 205.

Originally, the constituency comprised the city of Mainz and the districts of Bingen and Landkreis Mainz excluding the Amtsgerichtsbezirk of Oppenheim. In the 1972 through 2013 elections, it acquired a configuration very similar to its current borders, but including the Verbandsgemeinde of Sprendlingen-Gensingen. It acquired its current borders in the 2017 election.

Members
The constituency was first represented by Joseph Schmitt of the Christian Democratic Union (CDU) from 1949 to 1953, followed by Josef Schlick from 1953 to 1965. Josef Hofmann then served a single term. Hugo Brandt of the Social Democratic Party (SPD) was elected in 1969 and served until 1983. Johannes Gerster of the CDU won the constituency in 1983 and was representative until 1994. Hans-Otto Wilhelm then served a single term. Eckhart Pick of the SPD was elected in 1998 and served until 2002, when he was succeeded by Michael Hartmann. Ute Granold of the CDU was representative from 2009 to 2013. Ursula Groden-Kranich was elected in 2013 and re-elected in 2017. Daniel Baldy won the constituency for the SPD in 2021.

Election results

2021 election

2017 election

2013 election

2009 election

References

Federal electoral districts in Rhineland-Palatinate
1949 establishments in West Germany
Constituencies established in 1949
Mainz
Mainz-Bingen